The 1973 Eastern Michigan Hurons football team represented Eastern Michigan University as an independent during the 1973 NCAA Division II football season. In their seventh and final season under head coach Dan Boisture, the Hurons compiled a 6–4 record and outscored their opponents, 265 to 190. The team's victories included games against Louisiana Tech (21–19), Youngstown State (42–2), and Weber State (44–7).

In February 1974, coach Boisture left Eastern Michigan to coach the Detroit Wheels in the World Football League. The Wheels shared Rynearson Stadium with the Hurons during the 1974 season, compiled a 1–13 record, and folded before the season had ended.

Schedule

References

Eastern Michigan
Eastern Michigan Eagles football seasons
Eastern Michigan Hurons football